Small intestine cancer is a cancer of the small intestine. It is relatively rare compared to other gastrointestinal malignancies such as gastric cancer (stomach cancer) and colorectal cancer.

Small intestine cancer can be subdivided into duodenal cancer (the first part of the small intestine) and cancer of the jejunum and ileum (the latter two parts of the small intestine). Duodenal cancer has more in common with stomach cancer, while cancer of the jejunum and ileum have more in common with colorectal cancer. Five-year survival rates are 65%.

Histopathologic types

Subtypes of small intestine cancer include:
 Adenocarcinoma
 Gastrointestinal stromal tumor
 Lymphoma
 Carcinoid tumors of the midgut

Risk factors

Risk factors for small intestine cancer include:
 Crohn's disease
 Celiac disease
 Radiation exposure
 Hereditary gastrointestinal cancer syndromes: familial adenomatous polyposis, hereditary nonpolyposis colorectal cancer, Peutz–Jeghers syndrome
 Males are 25% more likely to develop the disease

Benign tumours and conditions that may be mistaken for cancer of the small bowel:
 Hamartoma
 Tuberculosis

Additional images

References

External links 

Gastrointestinal cancer